This is a list of types of spears found worldwide throughout history.

Used equally in melee and thrown
 Migration Period spear

Normally melee
Bayonet (when fixed to a Long gun)

Asia
Arbir
Bambu Runcing
Dangpa
Gichang
 Hoko yari
Ji
Kama-yari
Qiang
Sibat
Trishula
Yari
Naginata 
Assegai

Europe

Ahlspiess
Boar spear
Bohemian earspoon
Brandistock
Dory
Fauchard
Goedendag
Halberd
Half pike
Hasta
Military fork
Ox tongue spear
Partisan
Pike
Plançon a picot
Ranseur
Sarissa
Spetum
Spontoon
Trident
Glaive

Elsewhere
 Hoeroa (Māori, New Zealand)
 Iklwa (Zulu)
 Makrigga (Zande)
 Tepoztopilli (Aztec)

Normally used from horseback
 Barcha
 Kontos
 Lance
 Xyston

Normally thrown
 Harpoon
 One flue harpoon
 Two flue harpoon

Europe

Angon
Falarica
Framea
Golo
Hak
Jaculum
Javelin
Lancea
Pilum
Plumbata
Soliferrum
Spiculum
 Verutum

Elsewhere
 Assegai (Africa)
 Djerid (Asia Minor, India and Africa)
 Toggling harpoon (Americas)

 
Spears